The Daily Guardian was an Australian daily newspaper published in Sydney from 1923 to 1931. It was owned by Smith's Newspapers Limited, a holding company controlled by James Joynton Smith and better known as the publisher of Smith's Weekly. It was known for publicity stunts, including offering its subscribers free insurance and sponsoring the first Miss Australia pageant. It ceased publication on 15 February 1931 as a result of the Great Depression.

The paper's editors and employees included Claude McKay, Robert Clyde Packer, Frank Packer, Voltaire Molesworth. and Colin Simpson

References

Defunct newspapers published in Sydney
1923 establishments in Australia
1931 disestablishments in Australia
Publications established in 1923
Publications disestablished in 1931
Daily newspapers published in Australia